The Roman Catholic Archdiocese of Manizales is an archdiocese located in the city of Manizales in Colombia.

History
 11 April 1900: Established as Diocese of Manizales from the Diocese of Medellín
 10 May 1954: Promoted as Metropolitan Archdiocese of Manizales

Special churches
Minor Basilicas:
Catedral Basílica Metropolitana de Nuestra Señora del Rosario in Manizales
Basílica Nuestra Señora de las Victorias in Santa Rosa de Cabal

Ordinaries
 Bishops of Manizales 
Gregorio Nazianzeno Hoyos † (16 Dec 1901 – 25 Oct 1921) Died
Tiberio de Jesús Salazar y Herrera † (6 Jul 1922 – 7 Jul 1932) Appointed, Coadjutor Archbishop of Medellín
Juan Manuel González Arbeláez † (3 Jul 1933 – 6 Jun 1934) Appointed, Titular Archbishop of Aenus
Luis Concha Córdoba † (13 Jul 1935 – 10 May 1954) see below; future Cardinal
 Archbishops of Manizales
Luis Concha Córdoba † (10 May 1954 – 18 May 1959) see above; Appointed, Archbishop of Bogotá (Cardinal in 1961)
Arturo Duque Villegas † (7 Jul 1959 – 22 May 1975) Retired
José de Jesús Pimiento Rodríguez  † (22 May 1975 – 15 Oct 1996) Resigned (became a Cardinal on 14 February 2015)
Fabio Betancur Tirado † (15 Oct 1996 Appointed – 7 Oct 2010) Resigned
Gonzalo Restrepo Restrepo (7 Oct 2010 – 6 Jan 2020) previously Coadjutor Archbishop; resigned
José Miguel Gómez Rodríguez (25 Apr 2021 Appointed – present)

Coadjutor archbishop
Gonzalo Restrepo Restrepo (2009-2010)

Auxiliary bishops
Baltasar Álvarez Restrepo † (1949-1952), appointed Bishop of Pereira
Samuel Silverio Buitrago Trujillo, C.M. † (1968-1972), appointed Bishop of Montería
Alberto Uribe Urdaneta † (1953-1957), appointed Bishop of Sonsón
Augusto Trujillo Arango † (1957-1960), appointed	Bishop of Jericó

Other priests of this diocese who became bishops
Rubén Isaza Restrepo † , appointed Auxiliary Bishop of Cartagena in 1952
Alberto Giraldo Jaramillo (priest here, 1958–1960), appointed Auxiliary Bishop of Popayán in 1974
José Miguel Gómez Rodríguez, appointed Bishop of Líbano-Honda in 2004
Óscar González Villa † , appointed Bishop of Girardota in 2006 (did not take effect)
Luis Horacio Gómez González † , appointed Vicar Apostolic of Puerto Gaitán in 2014
José Libardo Garcés Monsalve, appointed Bishop of Málaga-Soatá in 2016

Suffragan dioceses
 Armenia
 La Dorada–Guaduas
 Pereira

See also
Roman Catholicism in Colombia

Sources

External links
 Catholic Hierarchy
 GCatholic.org

Roman Catholic dioceses in Colombia
Roman Catholic Ecclesiastical Province of Manizales
Christian organizations established in 1900
Roman Catholic dioceses and prelatures established in the 19th century
Manizales